The Milal Museum of Art is an art museum in Seoul, South Korea.

Transportation
The museum is accessible within walking distance south of Daecheong Station of Seoul Metro.

See also
List of museums in South Korea

External links
Official site

Art museums and galleries in Seoul